A Bachelor's Wife is a 1919 silent drama film directed by Emmett J. Flynn and starring Mary Miles Minter. As with many of Minter's films, the film is thought to be a lost film. In the weeks before its release, some film magazines listed the feature under its working title “Mary O’Rourke.”

Plot
As described in Motion Picture Herald, Mary O’Rourke (Minter) arrives in America from Ireland and finds her young friend and baby deserted by the husband. Mary takes the baby to the Stuyvesant mansion, demanding that it be recognized. Mrs. Stuyvesant, an invalid, is delighted with the child, and mistaking Mary for her daughter-in-law, invites her to stay and take charge of the house. The doctor informs Mary that she must comply with the old lady's request, as a shock might prove fatal to her. John Stuyvesant arrives home and denounces Mary as an imposter. She admits that she is but insists that he shall do right by Norah. He insists he was never married, and to prove it starts to marry another girl. Mary confronts him with the marriage license, which it appears belongs to J. Frederick Stuyvesant, a cousin. He had failed to acknowledge Norah as his wife while waiting to come into his fortune. Things straighten themselves out, Norah and the child come into their own and Mary and John decide to marry.

Cast
 Mary Miles Minter as Mary O’Rourke
 Allan Forrest as John Stuyvesant
 Myrtle Reeves as Norah Cavanagh
 Lydia Knott as Mrs Stuyvesant
 Charles Spere as Fred Stuyvesant
 Margaret Shelby as Genevieve Harbison
 Harry Holden as Dr Burt

References

External links
 

1919 films
1919 drama films
Silent American drama films
American silent feature films
American black-and-white films
Lost American films
1919 lost films
Lost drama films
Films with screenplays by Joseph F. Poland
Films set in country houses
1910s American films